The Euro Players Tour Championship 2010/2011 – Event 4 (also known as the 2010 MIUS Cup) was a professional minor-ranking snooker tournament that took place between 28 and 31 October 2010 at the South West Snooker Academy in Gloucester, England.

The event was planned to be staged at the Ortenau Halle in Offenburg, Germany and would have been known as the 2010 Ortenau Cup. Due to poor ticket sales and the top players competing in the new cue sports tournament Power Snooker it was moved to Gloucester, England.

Stephen Lee won the final 4–2 against Stephen Maguire.

Prize fund and ranking points 
The breakdown of prize money and ranking points of the event is shown below:

 1 Only professional players can earn ranking points.
 2 Prize money earned from the Plate competition does not qualify for inclusion in the Order of Merit.

Main draw

Preliminary round 
Best of 7 frames

Main rounds

Top half

Section 1

Section 2

Section 3

Section 4

Bottom half

Section 5

Section 6

Section 7

Section 8

Finals

Plate draw

Century breaks
 

 136, 133, 103, 100  Stephen Maguire
 133  Sam Baird
 132, 129, 119  Graeme Dott
 132  Mark Selby
 130  Joe Perry
 128, 106  Ali Carter
 128  Kyren Wilson
 127, 120  Joe Jogia
 125, 119  Xiao Guodong
 124  Alan McManus
 123, 110  David Grace
 116  Andrew Norman
 112, 103  Liu Chuang
 112  Andrew Pagett
 111  Mark Joyce
 110, 102  Anthony McGill
 110, 100  Fergal O'Brien
 
 110  Jack Lisowski
 110  Andy Hicks
 110  Marcus Campbell
 108, 107, 100  Mark Davis
 108, 101  Gerard Greene
 107, 103, 102  David Gilbert
 107, 103  Liam Highfield
 107  Judd Trump
 107  Jamie Brown
 105  Martin Gould
 105  Steve Davis
 105  Andrew Higginson
 102  Ben Woollaston
 102  Stuart Bingham
 102  Jamie Burnett
 101  Liu Song
 100  Jimmy White

References 

4 Euro
2010 in English sport

sv:Euro Players Tour Championship 2010/2011#Euro Players Tour Championship 4